Richard Parnell Habersham, born in Manhattan and raised in Harlem, is an American actor in theatre and film, as well as, a real estate broker  in New York City.

Biography
Richard Habersham has appeared in theatre productions  such as Ron Mark's fantasy farce Panache!   and on Broadway in Joe Turner's Come and Gone,  the Tony Award nominated drama written by Pulitzer Prize winning playwright August Wilson.  Habersham played the role of Travis Younger  in the Union Square Theatre 25th Anniversary Off Broadway production of Lorraine Hansberry's A Raisin in the Sun.

In film,  Habersham played Eddie in Spike Lee's Do the Right Thing,  Theodore Cotter in The Long Walk Home,  the young Jake Branch in the black-and-white independent feature Lou, Pat & Joe D,  and Cathy's younger brother in  The Cabinet of Dr. Ramirez, a "freewheeling musical horror spoof" directed by Peter Sellars.

Habersham earned his B.A. in history from the University of Virginia and his M.S. in real estate development from Columbia University's Graduate School of Architecture.  The history of the American Civil War is one of his particular interests.

In 2019, Habersham ran for New York's 13th Congressional District. He also launched a nonprofit organization, solutionsNOW, with the goal of servicing members of that neighborhood.

Filmography

References

Year of birth missing (living people)
Living people
Male actors from New York City
People from Harlem
African-American male actors
American real estate businesspeople
New York (state) Democrats
21st-century African-American people